Euzopherodes taprobalis is a species of snout moth in the genus Euzopherodes. It was described by George Hampson in 1908. It is found in Sri Lanka.

References

Moths described in 1908
Phycitini